is a private university in Meitō-ku, Nagoya, Aichi Prefecture, Japan. The predecessor of the school was founded in 2001. The present name was adopted in 2007.

External links
 Official website

Educational institutions established in 2001
Private universities and colleges in Japan
Universities and colleges in Nagoya
2001 establishments in Japan